Atlético Socopó Fútbol Club, is a professional football club based in Socopó, Barinas, Venezuela who currently plays in the Tercera División.

On 2018, the team merged with Libertador, who took their place in the Segunda División. Atlético Socopó later resurged with a new organization, and will start playing in the Tercera División.

References

External links
Twitter page

Association football clubs established in 2001
Atlético Socopó
2001 establishments in Venezuela
Defunct football clubs in Venezuela